flydubai serves the following destinations as of  :

List

References

Lists of airline destinations